Sixes and sevens may refer to:
At sixes and sevens, an English phrase and idiom, common in the United Kingdom
Sixes and Sevens, 1911 collection of short stories by O. Henry
At Sixes and Sevens, Sirenia's debut album
Sixes & Sevens, Adam Green's fifth solo record, released on March 7, 2008
Sixes and Sevens, a solitaire card game similar to Contradance